"Wings of Love" is the debut single by Swedish supergroup Liv. It was released on 30 September 2016. The music video for "Wings of Love" was shot on 3 July 2016 and directed by Lykke Li. On 1 July, Li asked people to participate in the video by being naked. On 4 November 2016, an alternate "tantra" version of the song was released, featuring Punjabi singer Jasbir Jassi.

References

2016 songs
2016 singles
Liv (band) songs
Lykke Li songs
Miike Snow songs
Songs written by Lykke Li
Songs written by Andrew Wyatt
Songs written by Pontus Winnberg
Songs written by Björn Yttling
Songs written by Jeff Bhasker
Song recordings produced by Jeff Bhasker